Beau Monde is a  Dutch language monthly glamour and lifestyle magazine published in Amsterdam, the Netherlands. The phrase "beau monde" is also used throughout English-speaking countries, which means a fashionable society.

Overview
Beau Monde was established in 1995. The magazine was owned by Sanoma and was published by Sanoma Uitgevers. Pijper Media acquired the magazine in April 2016. The magazine has its headquarters in Hoofddorp. Its editor-in-chief in 2015 is Ellen Litz. The magazine targets women between 21 and 45 years of age.

The magazine organizes an annual "Beau Monde Award".

References

External links
Official website

1995 establishments in the Netherlands
Celebrity magazines
Women's magazines published in the Netherlands
Monthly magazines published in the Netherlands
Dutch-language magazines
Lifestyle magazines
Magazines established in 1995
Magazines published in Amsterdam
Women's fashion magazines